Crenicichla percna is a species of cichlid native to South America. It is found in the Amazon River basin, in the Xingu River at Cachoeira do Espelho and Altamira, Brazil.

References

percna
Freshwater fish of Brazil
Fish of the Amazon basin
Taxa named by Sven O. Kullander
Fish described in 1991